How About This is an album by vocalist Kay Starr and pianist and bandleader Count Basie, released in 1969 by the Paramount Records label.

Background
In the 1960s, Basie had previously recorded for Roulette Records, Reprise, and Verve, before recording single albums for a number of labels, including Paramount. In December 1968, he recorded How About This with Starr; Dick Hyman was responsible for the arrangements.

Starr's vocal performance was likened to that of Dinah Washington.

Reception

AllMusic awarded the album 4½ stars.

Track listing
 "I Get the Blues When It Rains" (Marcy Klauber, Harry Stoddard) – 3:04
 "God Bless the Child" (Arthur Herzog, Jr., Billie Holiday) – 3:02
 "Baby Won't You Please Come Home" (Charles Warfield, Clarence Williams) – 2:48
 "Ain't No Use" (Leroy Kirkland, Sidney Wyche) – 2:46
 "Keep Smiling at Trouble (Trouble's a Bubble)" (Buddy DeSylva, Lewis Gensler, Al Jolson) – 1:58
 "If I Could Be with You" (James P. Johnson, Henry Creamer) – 2:41
 "My Man" (Jacques Charles, Channing Pollock, Albert Willemetz, Maurice Yvain) – 2:46
 "Hallelujah I Love Him So" (Ray Charles) – 2:59
 "I Can't Stop Loving You" (Don Gibson) – 3:07	
 "Goodtime Girl" (Scott Davis) – 3:00
 "A Cottage for Sale" (Willard Robison, Larry Conley) – 3:00

Personnel 
Adapted from All About Jazz and album liner notes.
Kay Starr – vocals
Count Basie – piano
Al Aarons, Oscar Brashear, Gene Coe, Sonny Cohn – trumpet 
Richard Boone, Steve Galloway, Grover Mitchell – trombone
Bill Hughes – bass trombone
Bobby Plater – alto saxophone, flute
Marshal Royal – alto saxophone, clarinet 
Eric Dixon – tenor saxophone, flute
Eddie "Lockjaw" Davis – tenor saxophone
Charlie Fowlkes – baritone saxophone
Freddie Green – guitar
Norman Keenan  – bass
Harold Jones – drums
Dick Hyman – arranger, conductor

References 

1969 albums
Kay Starr albums
Count Basie Orchestra albums
Paramount Records (1969) albums
Albums produced by Teddy Reig
Albums arranged by Dick Hyman
Albums conducted by Dick Hyman